Kumada (written:  lit. "bear rice field") is a Japanese surname. Notable people with the surname include:

, Japanese chemist
, Japanese child actress
, Japanese gravure idol and singer
, Japanese footballer and manager

See also
Kumada coupling, a cross coupling reaction

Japanese-language surnames